Ken Russell Memorial Classic is a Gold Coast Turf Club Group 3 Thoroughbred horse race for two-year-olds run at set weights over a distance of  at Gold Coast Racecourse, Surfers Paradise, Queensland, Australia in May. Total prizemoney is A$150,000.

History
The race is named in honour of jockey Kenneth Charles Russell (1951–1993), who was killed in a race fall at Sydney's Rosehill Racecourse in 1993. He was leading rider at the Gold Coast Racecourse four times. His major wins were in the 1989 Doncaster Handicap, 1991 George Ryder Stakes as well as the Queensland Derby, Queensland Oaks, Goodwood Handicap.

Name
1974–1993 - Gold Coast 2YO Classic Handicap
1994–1995 - Ken Russell 2YO Classic Handicap
1996 - Laurie Bricknell 2YO Classic
1997–1998 - Ken Russell 2YO Classic Handicap
1999 onwards - Ken Russell Memorial Classic

Distance
1974–1999 - 1,400 metres
2000–2005 - 1,300 metres
2006 onwards - 1,200 metres

Grade
1984–2013 - Listed Race
2014 onwards - Group 3

Conditions
 Prior 1997 - Handicap
1997–2004 - Quality Handicap
2005 onwards - Set weights

Winners

 2022 - Nettuno
 2021 - Subterranean
2020 - Wisdom Of Water
2019 - Stronger
2018 - Sesar
2017 - Taking Aim
2016 - Royal Tithe
2015 - Big Tree
2014 - Aimee 
2013 - Le Val
2012 - Sizzling
2011 - Hot Snitzel
2010 - Spirit Of Boom
2009 - Facile Tigre
2008 - Cat D'Antibes
2007 - I Have No Fear
2006 - Gold Edition
2005 - Foolish
2004 - Midnight City
2003 - Victory Grove
2002 - Tequila Knowledge
2001 - Palidamah
2000 - Ombra Della Sera
1999 - Let's Compromise
1998 - King Lotto
1997 - Noble Challenge
1996 - Super Espion
1995 - War Baron 
1994 - Brave Warrior 
1993 - Pimpala Son 
1992 - Surtee 
1991 - Gad's Hill
1990 - Shot Of Comfort
1989 - race not held
1988 - Temple Front
1987 - Superb Effort
1986 - Tristram
1985 - Rass Flyer
1984 - Gypsy Circle 
1983 - Riverdale 
1982 - Carnarvon Bridge   
1981 - Copperama   
1980 - Royal Paree 
1979 - Red Invader 
1978 - Rey Moro 
1977 - Pacific Prince 
1976 - Romantic Dream 
1975 - race not held      
1974 - Dungunnin

See also

 List of Australian Group races
 Group races

References

Horse races in Australia
Flat horse races for two-year-olds
Sport on the Gold Coast, Queensland